Acacia adoxa, commonly known as the grey-whorled wattle, is a species of plant in the legume family that is native to northern Australia.

Description
The phyllodes occur in grouped whorls with six to ten present in each group. It produces yellow flowers from April to October. The inflorescences are made up of globular flower-heads made up of 25 to 35 flowers.

Taxonomy
The species was first formally described by the botanist Leslie Pedley in 1972 as part of the work A revision of Acacia lycopodiifolia A. Cunn. ex Hook. and its Allies as published in Contributions from the Queensland Herbarium. Leslie later reclassified the species in 2003 as Racosperma adoxum but it was transferred back to the genus Acacia in 2006.

Distribution and habitat
It occurs on red sand soils, ironstone gravel, and stony plains. In Western Australia it is found in the Central Kimberley, Dampierland, Gascoyne, Great Sandy Desert, Little Sandy Desert, Northern Kimberley, Ord Victoria Plain, Pilbara and Tanami IBRA bioregions. It is also found in the central western parts of the Northern Territory.

Edible grubs are found among the rootstock and the seeds are often harvested by ants.

Varieties
 A. adoxa var. adoxa
 A. adoxa var. subglabra

See also
List of Acacia species

References

adoxa
Acacias of Western Australia
Fabales of Australia
Plants described in 1972
Flora of the Northern Territory
Taxa named by Leslie Pedley
Flora of Western Australia